The 2011 Allsvenskan, part of the 2011 Swedish football season, was the 87th season of Allsvenskan since its establishment in 1924. The preliminary 2011 fixtures were released on 15 December 2010. The season began on 2 April 2011 and ended on 23 October 2011. Malmö FF were the defending champions, having won their 16th Swedish championship and their 19th Allsvenskan title the previous season.

Helsingborgs IF won the Swedish championship this season, their 7th one, in the 27th round, nearly a month before the final round, on 25 September 2011 by Helsingborg defeating GAIS 3–1 and AIK playing a 1–1 tie against Malmö FF. This was the second year in a row that a club from Skåne clinched the championship title. This was also Helsingborg's first Swedish championship of the 21st century, and the first time since 1996 that a team secured the Allsvenskan championship so early in the season.

A total of 16 teams contested the league; 14 returned from the 2010 season and two had been promoted from Superettan.

Teams 
A total of sixteen teams contested the league, including fourteen sides from the 2010 season and two promoted teams from the 2010 Superettan.

Åtvidaberg and Brommapojkarna were relegated at the end of the 2010 season after finishing in the bottom two places of the table. Åtvidaberg thus made its immediate return to the Superettan, and Brommapojkarna ended a two-year tenure in the Allsvenskan. They were replaced by 2010 Superettan champions Syrianska FC and runners-up IFK Norrköping. Norrköping returned after a two-year absence, while Syrianska FC made their debut at the highest level of football in Sweden.

Gefle as 14th-placed team retained their Allsvenskan spot after defeating third-placed Superettan team GIF Sundsvall 3–0 on aggregate in a relegation/promotion playoff.

Stadia and locations

 1 According to each club information page at the Swedish Football Association website for Allsvenskan.

Personnel and kits

Note: Flags indicate national team as has been defined under FIFA eligibility rules. Players and Managers may hold more than one non-FIFA nationality.

 1 According to each club information page at the Swedish Football Association website for Allsvenskan.
 2 Officially listed as head coach due to the fact that their respective coach partners are missing manager licenses.

Managerial changes

Abandoned matches
The 2011 Allsvenskan was marred by several incidents involving both pyrotechnical items and supporter violence, with two matches needing to be suspended and one match needing to be re-played. According to Aftonbladet, even if one club's fans were responsible for a particular incident, each club was responsible for their own supporter sections in every match. In other words, even if one club's fans were responsible, the other club would have been sanctioned if the incident occurred in any of their supporter sections. In each of the three matches, either of the teams were up by one goal.

Syrianska FC vs. AIK
The match between Syrianska FC and AIK on 25 April 2011 was halted after twenty minutes of play when an assistant referee was hit by fireworks and, as a result, suffered tinnitus. Syrianska FC at that time led the game 1–0. Right before the fireworks were launched, AIK's striker, Teteh Bangura, was sent off after stamping Syrianska FC goalkeeper Dwayne Miller on his foot. Several firecrackers were thrown. The Swedish Football Association (SFA) concluded that it couldn't be proved which club's supporter section the firecrackers came from, but concluded that the behaviour of the AIK fans shortly after led to the suspension of the game. As a consequence, the game was awarded 3–0 in Syrianska FC's favour on 12 May 2011; AIK were fined 150,000 SEK.

Malmö FF vs. Helsingborgs IF
In a similar incident on 24 May 2011, a Skåne derby match between Malmö FF and Helsingborgs IF had to be abandoned after thirty minutes, right after Helsingborg had scored to take the lead 1–0. Helsingborg goalkeeper Pär Hansson was left injured by a firecracker thrown by a spectator from Malmö FF's standing section detonating right beside him, before being pushed by a spectator who made it onto the pitch from the same standing section. The SFA did not disqualify the theory that the man throwing the firecracker might have been the same man as the one who invaded the pitch. (The Malmö District Court later concluded that was the case.) Both Malmö FF and Canal+, the broadcaster of the match, sued the man invading the pitch for abandoning the match and television broadcasting of it. The game was awarded 3–0 in Helsingborg's favour on 17 June 2011. Malmö were given a 150,000 SEK fine, while Helsingborg were fined 25,000 SEK.

On 18 October 2011, the man who invaded the pitch was sentenced by the Malmö District Court to 120 day-fines for a total of 10,000 SEK, not only for invading the pitch but also for throwing the firecracker.

Malmö FF vs. Djurgårdens IF
Malmö FF were involved in another incident at their home arena, Swedbank Stadion, this time in a match against Djurgårdens IF, on 30 July 2011. Like the Syrianska–AIK and Malmö–Helsingborg matches, the Malmö–Djurgården match was abandoned, after eleven minutes, after four fireworks had been launched. At that time, Malmö FF were leading 1–0. A total of six fireworks were launched, forcing the referee to abandon the match. According to Canal+, one of the fireworks was close to hitting a photographer. There were different opinions as to where the fireworks came from: Canal+ believed that the fireworks came from the section above the Djurgården terrace while the police believed that the fireworks came from within the Djurgården section. Swedish Discipline Committee chairman Khennet Thallinger stated that they "want to preserve the due process". On 5 September 2011, the Committee decided that the game would be replayed from the first kick-off, since it could not be verified which club's supporter section the fireworks came from. The SFA's Competition Committee decided that the rematch would be played on 15 October 2011. This forced them to delay the Malmö–Syrianska and Halmstad–Djurgården games in-between to 17 October, as all Allsvenskan teams should have at least one rest day between each game. The rematch was won by Malmö 1–0.

League table

Positions by round
Note: Since some matches were postponed, the positions were corrected in hindsight.

Results

Relegation play-offs

Syrianska FC won 4–3 on aggregate.

Season statistics

 4 Player scored 4 goals

Scoring
First goal of the season (time of day): Imad Khalili for IFK Norrköping against GAIS (15:15, 3 April 2011)
First goal of the season (match minute): Peter Ijeh for Syrianska FC against Gefle (4' min, 3 April 2011)
Widest winning margin: 6 goals – Häcken 6–0 Mjällby (3 July 2011)
Highest scoring game: 10 goals – Helsingborgs IF 7–3 Trelleborgs FF (23 June 2011)
Most goals scored in a match by a single team: 7 goals – Helsingborgs IF 7–3 Trelleborgs FF (23 June 2011)
Fewest games failed to score in: 2 – Helsingborgs IF
Most games failed to score in: 15 – Syrianska FC

Discipline
Worst overall disciplinary record (1 pt per yellow card, 3 pts per red card):  70 – Syrianska FC (55 yellow cards, 5 red cards)
Best overall disciplinary record: 27 – Gefle (24 yellow cards, 1 red card)
Most yellow cards (club): 55 – Syrianska FC
Most yellow cards (player): 11 – Ivan Ristić (Syrianska FC)
Most red cards (club):  5 – Syrianska FC
Most red cards (player): 2 – Bobbie Friberg da Cruz (IFK Norrköping)
Most fouls (player): 51 – Shpëtim Hasani (IFK Norrköping)

Clean sheets
Most clean sheets: 12 – AIK
Fewest clean sheets: 4 – Trelleborgs FF

See also 

Competitions
 2011 Svenska Cupen
 2011 Supercupen
 2011 Superettan

Team seasons
 2011 Djurgårdens IF season
 2011 Halmstads BK season
 2011 Malmö FF season

Transfers
 List of Swedish football transfers winter 2010–2011
 List of Swedish football transfers summer 2011
 List of Swedish football transfers winter 2011–2012

References

External links 

  

Allsvenskan seasons
Swed
Swed
1